T road may refer to:
 T roads in Zambia
 T roads in Terrengganu, Malaysia, part of the Malaysian State Roads system
 T roads in Ukraine, regional network of territorial roads
 Trunk roads in the old road system of Ireland
 Corridor T, part of the Appalachian Development Highway System in Pennsylvania and New York, U.S.